Lilius Bratton Rainey (July 27, 1876 – September 27, 1959) was a U.S. Representative from Alabama.

Biography
He was born in Dadeville, Alabama on July 27, 1876.

Rainey attended the common schools and moved to Fort Payne, Alabama. He graduated from the Alabama Polytechnic Institute in Auburn, Alabama in 1899 and from the law department of the University of Alabama at Tuscaloosa in 1902. He was admitted to the bar in the latter year and commenced practice in Gadsden, Alabama.

Rainey was elected a captain in the Alabama National Guard in 1903. He was reelected and commissioned in 1906, but resigned the command in 1907. He was city solicitor of Gadsden in 1911–1917.

Rainey was elected as a Democrat to the Sixty-sixth Congress to fill the vacancy caused by the death of John L. Burnett. He was reelected to the Sixty-seventh Congress and served from September 30, 1919, to March 3, 1923. He declined to be a candidate for renomination in 1922.  He was a trustee of the state department of archives and history, Montgomery, Alabama.
He resumed the practice of law in Gadsden until his death.

He died in Gadsden, Alabama on September 27, 1959, and he was interred in Glenwood Cemetery in Fort Payne, Alabama.

References

 Attribution

External links
 

1876 births
1959 deaths
Alabama National Guard personnel
Auburn University alumni
Democratic Party members of the United States House of Representatives from Alabama
National Guard (United States) officers
People from Dadeville, Alabama
People from Fort Payne, Alabama
University of Alabama School of Law alumni